Michael Attalides (also Michalis Attalidis) is a prominent Cypriot academic, former civil servant and diplomat to Cyprus. He is the current Rector at the University of Nicosia in Nicosia, Cyprus.

After graduating from the London School of Economics and Political Science with a BSc in Economics, he received an MA and, in 1966, a PhD in Sociology from Princeton University.

He has represented the Republic of Cyprus as its Ambassador in a number of capitals, including Paris, London, and the European Union in Brussels, before being appointed Permanent Secretary of the Ministry of Foreign Affairs. He has also represented the Cyprus Government in the European Convention.

Following his retirement from civil service, he has been Dean of the School of Humanities, Social Sciences and Law at Intercollege, a lecturer in Sociology at the University of Leicester, a counterpart to the UNESCO Expert at the Cyprus Social Research Centre and a guest lecturer at the Free University of Berlin.

He is currently the Rector at the University of Nicosia, formerly called Intercollege, in Nicosia, Cyprus, serving on the Council and the Senate of the University.

He has published several books including Cyprus: Nationalism and International Politics, and Social Change and Urbanisation in Cyprus. He has also published a number of articles on society and politics in Cyprus and Greece.

References

External links
 Profile of Professor Michael Attalides, Rector of the University of Nicosia. University of Nicosia official website.
 Profile of Michael Attalides, Rector of Intercollege. Intercollege official website.
 Right of Reply : Michael Attalides. The Independent, 21 July 1999.

Living people
Cypriot diplomats
Permanent Representatives of Cyprus to the European Union
Ambassadors of Cyprus to France
High Commissioners of Cyprus to the United Kingdom
Year of birth missing (living people)
Academic staff of the University of Nicosia
Heads of universities and colleges in Cyprus